Luca Persiani (born 11 April 1984 in Province of Rome, Albano Laziale) is an Italian auto racing driver. He has competed in such series as International Formula Master and Eurocup Formula Renault 2.0.

References

External links
 
 

1984 births
Living people
People from Albano Laziale
Italian racing drivers
Italian Formula Renault 2.0 drivers
Formula Renault Eurocup drivers
Asian Formula Renault Challenge drivers
International Formula Master drivers
Blancpain Endurance Series drivers
European Le Mans Series drivers
24 Hours of Spa drivers
International GT Open drivers
WeatherTech SportsCar Championship drivers
Sportspeople from the Metropolitan City of Rome Capital

BVM Racing drivers
SMP Racing drivers
AF Corse drivers
Cram Competition drivers